Olga Kharitonova (née Belkina; born August 23, 1990, in Saint Petersburg) is a Russian sprinter. She competed in the 100 metres competition at the 2012 Summer Olympics; she ran Round 1 in 11.38 seconds, which did not qualify her for the semifinals.  She also ran in the heats of the women's .

References

External links 
 

1990 births
Living people
Athletes from Saint Petersburg
Russian female sprinters
Olympic female sprinters
Olympic athletes of Russia
Athletes (track and field) at the 2012 Summer Olympics
World Athletics Championships athletes for Russia
Russian Athletics Championships winners
20th-century Russian women
21st-century Russian women